Isabelle Galmiche (Gal-MEE-sh; born 19 November 1971) is a French rally co-driver and mathematics teacher. As of January 2022, she is the co-driver for nine-time World Rally Champion Sebastien Loeb, driving for M-Sport Ford in the World Rally Championship.

Rally career
Galmiche and Loeb won the 90th Rally Monte Carlo on January 23, 2022, becoming the oldest driver and female co-driver, respectively, to win a WRC rally. Galmiche became the first woman co-driver to win a WRC event since Fabrizia Pons in 1997. She has been Loeb's co-driver on tests, deputising for his former co-driver Daniel Elena on a part-time basis, since 2012.

Rally victories

WRC victories

World Rally Championship results

References

External links
 Isabelle Galmiche's e-wrc profile

1971 births
Living people
Female rally drivers
French rally co-drivers
French schoolteachers
Mathematics educators
World Rally Championship co-drivers